), commonly known by its acronym ETS, is a railway infrastructure manager operating in the Basque Country, Spain. The company was formed in 2004, but the railway infrastructure it operates was transferred from Euskotren in 2006. It is a member of the International Union of Railways.

The company owns the network in which Euskotren operates (including the Irauregi-Lutxana and Ariz-Basurto freight lines), as well as the infrastructure of the Bilbao and Vitoria-Gasteiz tram systems. The company is also building the Gipuzkoan branch of the Basque Y high-speed line under an agreement with ADIF.

References

External links 
 

Railway infrastructure managers
2004 establishments in the Basque Country (autonomous community)
Railway companies established in 2004
Railway companies of the Basque Country (autonomous community)
Basque Government
Government-owned companies of Spain
Organisations based in Bilbao